Hyphomicrobium denitrificans is a bacterium from the genus of Hyphomicrobium which was isolated from the Netherlands.

References

External links
Type strain of Hyphomicrobium denitrificans at BacDive -  the Bacterial Diversity Metadatabase

 

Hyphomicrobiales
Bacteria described in 1995